In Between Dreams is the third studio album by singer-songwriter Jack Johnson, released by Brushfire Records in the United States on March 1, 2005 (see 2005 in music). The album received generally mixed reviews from music critics. However, the album achieved considerable commercial success.

Album cover
The album cover depicts a mango tree, referring to the Mango Tree, the studio where In Between Dreams was recorded. There is also a reference to the mango tree in "Better Together".

Critical reception
At Metacritic, which assigns a normalized rating out of 100 to reviews from mainstream publications, the album received an average score of 58, based on 15 reviews. MacKenzie Wilson of AllMusic describes Johnson as "stick[ing] with what he does best" on the album; this has led some critics to characterize the album as feeling "safe" or unambitious. However, Barry Walters of Rolling Stone argues that Johnson explored new content with more politically minded tracks like "Crying Shame" and "Staple It Together". Most critics have described Johnson's delivery as laid-back or mellow; some tracks were also characterized as employing a "light reggae lilt", a stylistic choice which was generally criticized. The overall mood of the album has been described as "upbeat" and "uplifting".

Track listing

Personnel
Musicians
Jack Johnson – vocals and guitars
Sam Lapointe – lead guitar
Simon Tessier – bassoon
Zach Gill – piano on "Good People" and "Sitting, Waiting, Wishing", accordion on "Belle", melodica on "If I Could"
Adam Topol – drums and percussion
Merlo Podlewski – bass guitar
Johnald Hernandez – backup vocals

Production
Mario Caldato, Jr. – producer, engineer
Zachary Von Wilkenstein – sound producer, backup vocals
Robert Carranza – engineering
Thomas Campbell – photography
Dave Homcy – photographer

Charts

Weekly charts

Year-end charts

Decade-end charts

Certifications

Sheet music
The artist-approved sheet music of this album is available through Cherry Lane Music Company in a "Play It Like It Is" guitar folio.

References

External links
 Honolulu Advertiser: "Johnson hits the road, sharing his 'Dreams'" – Inspiration behind the songs

2005 albums
Albums produced by Mario Caldato Jr.
Brushfire Records albums
Jack Johnson (musician) albums